Nick Vincent may refer to:
 Nick Vincent (musician) (born 1958), American drummer, producer and composer
 Nick Vincent (baseball) (born 1986), American baseball pitcher